The 1961 season was the Minnesota Vikings' first in the National Football League (NFL) after being created as an expansion franchise to become the league's fourteenth team. Their inaugural regular season game was a 37–13 victory at home to the Chicago Bears; rookie quarterback Fran Tarkenton came off the bench to toss four touchdown passes and run for another. However, under head coach Norm Van Brocklin, the Vikings won just two of their remaining 13 games, including a seven-game losing streak, and finished the season with a 3–11 record.

The Vikings' defense surrendered 5.41 rushing yards per attempt in 1961, the fifth-most of all time.

Offseason
Although the NFL originally had no interest in expanding, after Max Winter and Bill Boyer agreed to start an American Football League (AFL) franchise in Minnesota, the NFL approached them to change leagues. The "Vikings" name was given to the team by Ole Haugsrud, who had been given a 10% stake in the franchise as a result of having sold the Duluth Eskimos back to the league in the 1920s.

1961 Draft

1961 Expansion Draft

Roster

Preseason

Regular season

Schedule

Game summaries

Week 1: vs. Chicago Bears

This was the first regular season game in Vikings history. George Shaw started the game at quarterback for the Vikings, but he was soon replaced by rookie Fran Tarkenton, who threw four touchdown passes and ran for another as the Vikings won 37–13. They were the last expansion team to win their first game until the 2002 Houston Texans.

Week 2: at Dallas Cowboys

Week 3: at Baltimore Colts

Week 4: vs. Dallas Cowboys

Week 5: vs. San Francisco 49ers

Week 6: vs. Green Bay Packers

Week 7: at Green Bay Packers

Week 8: at Los Angeles Rams

Week 9: vs. Baltimore Colts

Week 10: vs. Detroit Lions

Week 11: at San Francisco 49ers

Week 12: vs. Los Angeles Rams

Week 13: at Detroit Lions

Week 14: at Chicago Bears

Standings

Postseason
Both halfback Hugh McElhenny and receiver (end) Jerry Reichow were voted to the East–West Pro Bowl game, played January 14, 1962, at the Los Angeles Memorial Coliseum. The coach for the West squad was Vikings head coach Norm Van Brocklin. McElhenny scored a third-quarter touchdown on a 10-yard pass from Green Bay Packers quarterback Bart Starr, and the West won the game 31–30.

Statistics

Team leaders

League rankings

References

Minnesota Vikings seasons
Minnesota
Minnesota Vikings